Ahmad Nur Hardianto (born 6 March 1995, in Lamongan) is an Indonesian professional footballer who plays as a striker for Liga 1 club Borneo.

International career 
He made his international debut for senior team on 21 March 2017, scoring one goal against Myanmar.

Career statistics

Club

International

International goals 
Indonesia

Honours

Club
Arema
 Indonesia President's Cup: 2019

References

External links
 
 

1995 births
Living people
Indonesian footballers
People from Lamongan Regency
Liga 1 (Indonesia) players
Persela Lamongan players
Arema F.C. players
Bhayangkara F.C. players
Persita Tangerang players
Borneo F.C. players
Indonesia international footballers
Association football forwards
Sportspeople from East Java
21st-century Indonesian people